Silent Cries is a 1993 television film adaptation, directed by Anthony Page, of Guests of the Emperor by Janice Young Brooks.

Cast
Gena Rowlands as Peggy Sutherland
Annabeth Gish as Hazel Hampton
Chloe Webb as Dinki Denk
Gail Strickland as Roberta Hampton
Phyllis Logan as Nancy Muir
Judy Parfitt as Beryl Stacton
Cherie Lunghi as Audrey St John
Clyde Kusatsu as Saburo Saigo
Kim Braden	as Mrs. Webber
Pamela Brull as Jane Kowolski
Stan Egi as Spike
Nick Tate	
Sab Shimono as Natsume
Sylvia Short as Dr. Millichope
Natsuko Ohama as Nurse Royama
Camille James Harman (as Camille Meaux) as Mrs. Halliburton
Yuji Okumoto as Mickey (uncredited)

References

1993 films
1993 television films
Films directed by Anthony Page
Films scored by Billy Goldenberg